Joseph Jekyll FRS (1 January 1754 – 8 March 1837) was a British Whig Member of Parliament for Calne, Wiltshire.

He was the eldest son of Capt. Edward Jekyll, R.N., of Haverfordwest and educated at Westminster School (1766–1770) and Christ Church, Oxford, where he was awarded BA in 1774 and MA in 1777. He trained for the law at Lincoln's Inn from 1769 and was called to the bar in 1778.

In 1782 Jekyll wrote a memoir of the black composer Ignatius Sancho to preface the collection of Sancho's letters. Initially published anonymously, the memoir was attributed to Jekyll in the 1803 edition of the Letters.

He was elected in 1790 a Fellow of the Royal Society as "a Gentleman conversant in various Branches of Literature".

He married in 1801 Maria, the daughter of MP Hans Sloane, with whom he had two sons. The youngest was the father of the garden designer, Gertrude Jekyll.

He was made Bencher at the Inner Temple in 1805, reader in 1814 and treasurer in 1816. He was appointed solicitor-general to the Prince of Wales and made King's Counsel in 1805.

In 1787 he was elected Member of Parliament for Calne, a seat he held until 1816, after which he resigned by accepting the notional crown appointment as Steward of the Chiltern Hundreds.

In 1824, Joseph inherited the Wargrave Hill (now Wargrave Manor) estate in Berkshire, although he preferred to live in Mayfair and so rented it out to tenants. He died in London in 1837.

References

 

1754 births
1837 deaths
Alumni of Christ Church, Oxford
People from Mayfair
Members of the Inner Temple
Members of the Parliament of Great Britain for English constituencies
British MPs 1784–1790
British MPs 1790–1796
British MPs 1796–1800
UK MPs 1801–1802
UK MPs 1802–1806
UK MPs 1812–1818
Fellows of the Royal Society
Members of the Parliament of the United Kingdom for English constituencies
People educated at Westminster School, London
Fellows of the Society of Antiquaries of London
English barristers
19th-century King's Counsel
English writers